Mount Tully is a rural  locality in the Southern Downs Region, Queensland, Australia.

Geography
The terrain is mountainous and most of the land use occurs in the flatter valleys.

History 
The locality was named and bounded on 15 December 2000. It presumably takes its name from some local mountain peak, but no mountain of that name has been officially gazetted in the area, suggesting it is a local name.

Mount Tully State School opened on 1921 and closed circa 1943.

References 

Southern Downs Region
Localities in Queensland